The 1986 NCAA Rifle Championships were contested at the seventh annual competition to determine the team and individual national champions of NCAA co-ed collegiate rifle shooting in the United States. The championship was held at the United States Naval Academy in Annapolis, Maryland. 

West Virginia, with a team score of 6,229, won their third team title, besting defending champions Murray State by 66 points in the team standings. It was the Mountaineers third title in four years and the third for coach Edward Etzel. 

The individual champions were, for the smallbore rifle, Mike Anti (West Virginia), and, for the air rifle, Marianne Wallace (Murray State).

Qualification
Since there is only one national collegiate championship for rifle shooting, all NCAA rifle programs (whether from Division I, Division II, or Division III) were eligible. A total of seven teams ultimately contested this championship.

Results
Scoring:  The championship consisted of 120 shots by each competitor in smallbore and 40 shots per competitor in air rifle.

Team title

Individual events

References

NCAA Rifle Championship
NCAA Rifle Championships
1986 in shooting sports
NCAA Rifle Championships